CS Phoenix Galați is a professional basketball team from Galați, Romania. The team plays in the Liga Națională, following their championship in the Liga I in 2015. The team finished on 7th place in the first year and reached the first round of the play-offs and in the season 2016-2017 they finished on 9th place with 8 wins plus 16 losses.

Trophies
Liga I (1):
2014–15

Season by season

Current roster

References

Galați
Sport in Galați
Basketball teams in Romania
Basketball teams established in 2000
2000 establishments in Romania